Eva Eriksson may refer to:

 Eva Lund (born Eva Eriksson in 1971), Swedish curler
 Eva Eriksson (politician), county governor in Sweden
 Eva Eriksson (illustrator) (born 1949), Swedish illustrator and writer